Belmez is a village and municipality with  inhabitants in Córdoba, Andalucia, Spain.

It is usually confused with Bélmez de la Moraleda, a village in the Province of Jaén (Spain), because the resemblance of their names: "Belmez" (Córdoba) and "Bélmez" (Jaén).

References

Municipalities in the Province of Córdoba (Spain)